Tricholoma cingulatum is a mushroom of the agaric genus Tricholoma. First described in 1830 as Agaricus cingulatus by Elias Magnus Fries, it was transferred to the genus Tricholoma by Almfelt in 1830.

See also
List of North American Tricholoma
List of Tricholoma species

References

cingulatum
Fungi described in 1830
Fungi of Europe
Fungi of North America